Gonneville-sur-Scie (literally Gonneville on Scie) is a commune in the Seine-Maritime department in the Normandy region in northern France.

Geography

Population

Places of interest
 The sixteenth century church of Saint-Valery.
 The chateau of La Vâtine, dating from the seventeenth century.

See also
Communes of the Seine-Maritime department

References

External links

Unofficial website 

Communes of Seine-Maritime